Broadcasting rights (often also called media rights) are rights which a broadcasting organization negotiates with a commercial concern - such as a sports governing body or film distributor - in order to show that company's products on television or radio, either live, delayed or highlights.

Intellectual property 
The World Intellectual Property Organization (WIPO), one of the 17 specialized agencies of the United Nations, aims to eliminate signal piracy.  
WIPO maintains that broadcasters' rights:
 safeguard costly investments in televising sporting events
 recognize and reward the entrepreneurial efforts of broadcasting organizations
 recognize and reward their contribution to diffusion of information and culture

See also 

 Broadcast license
 Retransmission consent
 Glossary of broadcasting terms
 2018 FIFA World Cup broadcasting rights
 2022 FIFA World Cup broadcasting rights
 UEFA Euro 2020 broadcasting rights
 UEFA European Qualifiers broadcasting rights
 2023 Cricket World Cup Broadcasting rights
 2016 President's Cup (Maldives) Broadcasting_rights
 Copa América Centenario broadcasting rights
 List of 2011 Cricket World Cup broadcasting rights

References 

Broadcast law